Licuala grandis, the ruffled fan palm, Vanuatu fan palm or Palas palm, is a species of palm tree in the family Arecaceae, native to Vanuatu, an island nation in the Pacific.  It grows in the understory of primary and secondary tropical rain forests.  It produces hermaphroditic inflorescences.  It bears round green fruit that redden as they ripen, each containing a single seed.

Synonyms
 Pritchardia grandis hort. ex W. Bull

References

 Mobot image
 Encke, F. et al. 1984. Zander: Handwörterbuch der Pflanzennamen, 13. Auflage.
 Liberty Hyde Bailey Hortorium. 1976. Hortus third.
 Moore, H. E., Jr. 1963. An annotated checklist of cultivated palms. Principes 7:149.
 Uhl, N. W. & J. Dransfield. 1987. Genera palmarum: a classification of palms based on the work of Harold E. Moore, Jr.

grandis
Endemic flora of Vanuatu
Trees of Vanuatu